Let the Fairies In is the eighth studio album by Irish singer Pádraigín Ní Uallacháin, the traditional singer in residence at the Seamus Heaney Centre for Poetry at Queen's University, Belfast. The album was released on 29 September 2012.

Background
Pádraigín Ní Uallacháin recorded her first album for children, A Stór Is A Stóirín in 1994. Completely in the Irish language, Ní Uallacháin opted to record a similar album in English.

Track listing

Personnel 
Pádraigín Ní Uallacháin – vocals, drones, bells
Dónal O'Connor – producer

References

External links
 LET THE FAIRIES IN - official website

2012 albums
Pádraigín Ní Uallacháin albums